is a Japanese family name.

It may describe one of several Koizumi railway stations.

It can refer to a number of people, including the following members of the prominent Koizumi family:
, former prime minister of Japan
, a second-generation Diet member and the father of Junichiro Koizumi
, Japanese politician and the father-in-law of Junya Koizumi
, an aspiring actor and the first son of Junichiro Koizumi
, a fourth-generation Diet member and the second son of Junichiro Koizumi

Other individuals 

Ariane Koizumi, American fashion model and actress
, Japanese poet
, a Japanese beach volleyball player
, the founder of British Judo
, Japanese footballer
, singer and actress
, Japanese model
, film director
, video game designer
, Japanese footballer

Fictional characters 
Koizumi-san, character in Ms. Koizumi Loves Ramen Noodles
Akako Koizumi, character in Magic Kaito
Asami Koizumi from the Young Justice animated series
, character in Haruhi Suzumiya series
Mika Koizumi, character in Choudenshi Bioman
Risa Koizumi, the protagonist of Love Com
Several characters in Guru Guru Pon-chan, Ponta, Yuki, Soichiro, and Ji Koizumi
Mahiru Koizumi, a character in Danganronpa 2: Goodbye Despair
Hanayo Koizumi, a character from "Love Live!"
Natsumi Koizumi, a character from School Days
 Yoshiko Koizumi, a main character girl from Little Ghost Q-Taro

See also 
, botanist whose standard abbreviation in botanical works is Koidz.

Japanese-language surnames